Alex Taylor With Friends and Neighbors is the 1971 debut album by Alex Taylor, brother of James, Livingston and Kate Taylor. The album was recorded in Macon, Georgia at Capricorn Studios. The standout tracks are brother James' "Highway Song", "It's All Over Now", along with David Brown & Gregg Allman's "Southbound".

Track listing
"Highway Song"  (James Taylor) - 3:17
"Southern Kids"  (Scott Boyer) - 2:31
"All in Line"  (Tommy Talton) - 2:50
"Night Owl"  (James Taylor) - 3:20
"C Song"  (Scott Boyer) - 2:10
"It's All Over Now"  (Bobby Womack, Shirley Womack) - 3:41
"Baby Ruth"  (Johnny Wyker) - 3:23
"Take Out Some Insurance"  (Charles Singleton) - 4:18
"Southbound"  (Gregg Allman, David Brown) - 8:30

Personnel
Alex Taylor - vocals
James Taylor - guitar
Scott Boyer - guitar, backing vocals
Tommy Talton - guitar
Paul Hornsby - keyboards
Johnny Sandlin - bass
Peter Kowalke - guitar
Joe Rudd - guitar
Bill Stewart - drums
King Curtis - saxophone
Willie Bridges - saxophone
Ronnie Cuber - saxophone
Frank Wess - saxophone
Daniel Moore - trumpet
William S. Fischer - conductor, string arrangements

Production
Producer: Johnny Sandlin
Recording Engineer: Lewis Hahn/Jim Hawkins
Art Direction: Jimmy Roberts
Photography: Mickey Dobo
Executive Supervisor: Frank Fenter

References

Alex Taylor (musician) albums
Capricorn Records albums
Covers albums
1971 debut albums